Robert Beugré Mambé (born 1 January 1952) is an Ivorian civil engineer and politician. Since 2011, he has been the governor of the Abidjan Autonomous District.

Beugré Mambé was born in Abiaté in present-day Dabou Department, Grands-Ponts Region, Lagunes District).

Beugré Mambé was trained as a civil engineer. He was educated in Abidjan at the École nationale supérieure des travaux publics and in Paris at the Centre des hautes études de la construction and the École nationale des ponts et chaussées. He was the head of Ivory Coast's Bureau central des études techniques and later was president of the country's electoral commission.

In April 2011 Beugré Mambé was appointed as the governor of Abidjan Autonomous District.

References
"Beugré Robert Mambé", abidjan.net, accessed 7 March 2016.
Baudelaire Mieu, "Robert Beugré Mambé : 'Tout le monde revient à Abidjan pour faire des affaires'", Jeune Afrique, 7 January 2015.
"Biographie du Gouverneur Robert Beugré Mambé", abidjan.district.ci, accessed 7 March 2016.

1952 births
Governors of districts of Ivory Coast
Ivorian engineers
Living people
People from Abidjan
People from Lagunes District
Civil engineers
École des Ponts ParisTech alumni